The Laksamana College of Business (or LCB), is an accredited private university college in Brunei Darussalam. It was the first British college opening a campus as a foreign educational institution in the country through its partnership with Kensington College of Business in the United Kingdom, University of Chester, and Abdul Razak Holdings, Brunei Darussalam.

Background

History 
The college was established in 2003 and officially launched on 18 March 2003 by Pehin Orang Kaya Indera Pahlawan Dato Seri Setia Awang Haji Suyoi bin Haji Osman, the Deputy Ministry of Education.

Since its establishment the college has acted as a subsidiary college of the Kensington College of Business. During 2008 the college became an authorised IC3 centre and was entrusted by Edexcel BTEC to deliver IT programs from 2010 onwards.

Motto 
Your One Stop For Quality Education.

Ranking 
According to Classbase, Laksamana College of Business is consistently listed in the top 10 universities and colleges in Brunei Darussalam. Currently, it is ranked as the leading (1st) among private institutions, tenth among public and private institutions, 4,065th among Asia universities and ranked as 13,642 among universities available worldwide.

Campus

Background 
LCB was originally a two-floors campus located at the AR Hotel Services Apartment, Plaza Abdul Razak, Jalan Laksamana in the heart of Bandar Seri Begawan.

By 19 August 2009, the college made expansion of an additional floor (known as third Floor). Recently, the college also expanded its premise of having another floor (known as second Floor) on 18 September 2013.
By 19 August 2009, the college made expansion of an additional floor (known as 3rd Floor). Recently, the college also expanded its premise of having another floor (known as 2nd Floor) on 18 September 2013.

Organisation and structure

Academic faculties 
The Laksamana College of Business main programs are:
 Business Studies (Business)
 Information Technology (Computing)
 Hospitality Management (Management)
Culinary School (Culinary Arts)

Programmes 
Two main routes are available for those who want to pursue a career in Business fields as following:
A Bachelor's Degree (BA) awarded by a university,
Professional Qualifications awarded by Kensington College of Business conducted and delivered by Laksamana College of Business namely KCB Certificate, Diploma, Advance Diploma and Higher Diploma which train the students for specific career in Administration, Marketing, Finance and any services.

The completion of education can be achieved by taking a Master of Business Administration and Master of Science.

Affiliations and collaborations 
The college has collaboration with the following parties:
Abdul Razak Holdings (Brunei Darussalam)
Kensington College of Business (United Kingdom)
University of Northumbria (United Kingdom)
University of Wales (United Kingdom)
Prifysgol Cymru (United Kingdom)
University of Cambridge International Examinations (United Kingdom)
University of the West of England (United Kingdom)
University of Northampton (United Kingdom)
Bangor University (United Kingdom)
University of Chester (United Kingdom)
University of Aberystwyth (United Kingdom)
Cardiff Metropolitan University (United Kingdom)
University College Birmingham (United Kingdom)
University of South Wales (United Kingdom)
London Chamber of Commerce and Industry (United Kingdom)
Edexcel BTEC - Business and Technology Education Council (United Kingdom)

Every students of Laksamana College of Business are entitled of furthering their educations in the United Kingdom through its linked-universities including Keele University, Northumbria University and Wales University just to name few. Some are given admission of advance entry into bachelor's degree programs in United States of America, Australia and Malaysia.

References

External links 
 Laksamana Business College, Brunei Darussalam
 Kensington Business College, United Kingdom

Business schools in Brunei
2003 establishments in Brunei
Educational institutions established in 2003